Miss America 1981, the 54th Miss America pageant, was held at the Boardwalk Hall in Atlantic City, New Jersey on September 6, 1980 on NBC Network.

The winner, Susan Powell of Oklahoma, later became co-host of the series Home Matters on the Discovery Channel.

Results

Order of announcements

Top 10

Preliminary awards

Other awards

Delegates

Judges
 Tom Snyder
 Janet Langhart
 Robert Merrill
 Dr. Glenn Whitesides
 Paul Lavalle
 Tad Tadlock
 Azie Taylor Morton

External links
 Miss America official website

1981
1980 in the United States
1981 beauty pageants
1980 in New Jersey
September 1980 events in the United States
Events in Atlantic City, New Jersey